There are a total of 115 government schools in Chandigarh (Primary-8, Middle-13, High School-53, Senior Secondary-40), seven aided schools, 37 recognized Senior Secondary private schools, 19 recognized private High Schools, 13 recognized private Middle Schools, 6 recognized private primary schools, and 3 recognized private play schools.

Notable schools  in Chandigarh include:

 Delhi Public School, Chandigarh 
 Government model high school sector 25 Chandigarh
 Government Model Senior Secondary School, Sector 16, Chandigarh
 Jawahar Navodaya Vidyalaya, sector 25 west, Chandigarh
 Kailash Bahl DAV Senior Secondary Public School, Chandigarh
 Sri Aurobindo School of Integral Education, Sector 27, Chandigarh
 St. Anne's Convent School, Sector - 32 D, Chandigarh 
 St. John's High School, Sector - 26, Chandigarh 
 St. Kabir Public School, Sector-26, Chandigarh 
 St. Mary's School, Sector 46-B, Chandigarh
 St. Stephen's School, Sector 45-B, Chandigarh 
 Tender Heart School, Opp. H. No 670, Sector 33-B, Chandigarh
 Vatika High School for Deaf & Dumb, Sector 19-B, Opposite Main Bazaar, Chandigarh

See also 
 List of schools in India
 List of institutions of higher education in Chandigarh

References 

Chandigarh
 
Punjab, India-related lists
Chandigarh-related lists